People Hold On ... The Remix Anthology is a remix album by British singer Lisa Stansfield, released by Edsel Records on 10 November 2014. It contains remixes of songs originally included on Stansfield's albums released between 1989 and 2001. The tracks were remixed by various prominent producers. In Europe, the album was issued on 21 November 2014.

Content
The album was released as a three-disc set in the United Kingdom on 10 November 2014 and in Europe on 21 November 2014. It includes thirty-three remixes of songs from "People Hold On" (1989) to "Let's Just Call It Love" (2001). Over the years since, Stansfield's songs were remixed by various prominent producers, including David Morales, Frankie Knuckles, Hex Hector, Masters at Work (Little Louie Vega and Kenny "Dope" Gonzalez), Shep Pettibone, The 45 King, Wyclef Jean and many others. This remastered three-disc anthology brings together thirty-three remixes, some of them previously unreleased, with a twenty-eight-page booklet featuring photos, memorabilia, lyrics and brand new sleeve notes. People Hold On ... The Remix Anthology was also released as a part of The Collection 1989–2003 on 10 November 2014 and in Europe on 21 November 2014.

The previously unreleased tracks on this album include: "All Around the World" (Attack Mix), "What Did I Do to You?" (Red Zone Mix), "The Love in Me" (12" Remix), "Time to Make You Mine" (Sunship Mix), three remixes of "Never, Never Gonna Give You Up" (Frankie's Classic Club Mix, Franktified Off the Hook Dub and After Hours Mix), "Never Gonna Fall" (Wyclef Remix) and "Let's Just Call It Love" (Feel It Mix).

Track listing

Release history

References

Lisa Stansfield remix albums
2014 remix albums